Brzimenne may refer to:

Bezimenne, Snihurivka urban hromada, Bashtanka Raion, Mykolaiv Oblast, Ukraine
Bezimenne, Kalmiuske Raion, Ukraine
Bezimenne gas field